Glyn Anderson has designed, programmed, and managed the production of video games starting with the Intellivision console. A musician as well as a programmer, he wrote the cross-platform sound and music driver used on many Activision games between 1989 and 1992, including Ghostbusters II and Lexi-Cross.

Career
Anderson started making games in 1980 as a programmer at APh Technological Consulting, the company that created the Intellivision for Mattel. He then worked at Activision creating Atari 8-bit family and Commodore 64 versions of Megamania, Ghostbusters, and Hacker II: The Doomsday Papers.

Anderson's current company, Game Production Services, creates Location-based Immersive Virtual Experience (LIVE)  training simulations, such as the Infantry Immersive Trainer and Joint Fires & Effects Trainer System (JFETS), primarily for the U.S. military.

Selected titles

References

External links
Anderson's profile on MobyGames

Activision
American video game designers
Video game programmers
Living people
Year of birth missing (living people)